Angela Price Aggeler is an American diplomat who is the United States ambassador to North Macedonia.

Early life and education
Aggeler is a graduate of the University of Utah.

Career
Aggeler is a career member of the Senior Foreign Service, with the rank of Minister-Counselor. She served as the Deputy Chief of Mission at the U.S. Embassy in Islamabad, Pakistan, previously serving as Chargé d'Affaires ad interim there. Aggeler formerly served as Minister Counselor for Public Affairs at the U.S. Embassy in Paris, France; Acting Principal Deputy Assistant Secretary of State for the Bureau of South and Central Asian Affairs and the Office of the Special Representative for Afghanistan and Pakistan in Washington, D.C.; and, Deputy Assistant Secretary of State for Press and Public Diplomacy in the Bureau of Press and Public Diplomacy. Earlier, she was Counselor for Public Affairs at the U.S. Embassy in Islamabad, Pakistan. Previous assignments include Public Affairs Officer at the American Embassy in Skopje, Macedonia; Cultural and Press Attaché of the U.S. Embassy in Hanoi, Vietnam; Spokesperson for the Bureau of Consular Affairs at the State Department; and assignments at the U.S. Embassy in Paris, France and U.S. Embassy in New Delhi, India. Prior to joining the Foreign Service, Aggeler worked for the State Department at U.S. Embassies in Ouagadougou, Burkina Faso and Budapest, Hungary, as well as the Consulate General in Madras, India. Earlier in her career, she worked at the National Gallery of Art in Washington, D.C., and as a Peace Corps Volunteer in the Central African Republic.

Ambassador to North Macedonia
On May 25, 2022, President Joe Biden nominated Aggeler to be the next U.S Ambassador to North Macedonia. Hearings on her nomination were held before the Senate Foreign Relations Committee on July 28, 2022. Her nomination was favorably reported the committee on August 3, 2022. Aggeler was confirmed by the Senate on August 4, 2022 via voice vote. She presented her credentials to President Stevo Pendarovski on November 8, 2022.

Awards and recognitions
Aggeler has won numerous State Department awards, including the Assistant Secretary's Award for Excellence in 2006 and the Mildred Sinclaire Award for Language (in Hindi, 2000).

Personal life
Aggeler speaks French, Macedonian, and some Hindi.

References

University of Utah alumni
United States Foreign Service personnel
Living people
Year of birth missing (living people)
American women diplomats
21st-century American diplomats
Ambassadors of the United States to North Macedonia
American diplomats